Wayne McCook (born 9 March 1961) is a Jamaican lawyer and career diplomat who was Jamaican first resident ambassador to China and served as Jamaica's permanent representative to the United Nations offices in Geneva, Switzerland and Rome, Italy. After four decades of diplomatic career, McCook retired from public service to a private career where he served as senior adviser to the Director General of World Trade Organization (WTO).

Early life and education 
McCook was born in Westmoreland, Jamaica. He studied for a bachelor of Arts degree at the University of the West Indies graduating in 1983 and earned a Law degree from Georgetown University Law Centre, USA, in 1993. In 1995, he obtained a Certificate in Legal Education from Norman Manley Law School, University of the West Indies, Jamaica, and a master's degree in International Relations from Fletcher School of Law and Diplomacy, Tufts University, USA.

Career 
McCook began his diplomatic career in 1984 as Administrative Officer, Ministry of Foreign Affairs and Foreign Trade and became Information Attaché to Jamaican High Commission in Ottawa, Canada from 1985 to 1987 when he was transferred to Jamaican embassy in Washington, DC serving in same position until 1993.

He returned home in 1993 and served in the Information Department, Ministry of Foreign Affairs and Foreign Trade until 1995, when he was appointed executive director of Broadcasting Commission of Jamaica in acting capacity for a year. From 1996 to 1998, he was Deputy Permanent Representative and Minister, Permanent Mission of Jamaica to the United Nations office in New York and Deputy Chief of Mission and Minister, Embassy of Jamaica, Washington, D.C. between 1998 and 2001 and served in several senior positions in the ministry of foreign affairs until 2007.

on 26 June 2008, McCook was appointed first Jamaican resident ambassador to the People's Republic of China and served concurrently as Jamaican non-resident ambassador to Laos, Vietnam, The Democratic People's Republic of Korea and Thailand and as nonresident High Commissioner to Pakistan and Bangladesh.

References 

Jamaican diplomats
Living people
1961 births
Permanent Representatives to the United Nations in Geneva